The Industry Connections Security Group (IEEE ICSG) is a global group of computer security entities (past and present members include: Anh Labs, AVG, Avira, ESET, F-Secure, K7 Computing, Kaspersky Labs, Marvell, McAfee, Microsoft, Palo Alto Networks, Panda Software, SafeNet, Sophos, Symantec and Trend Micro) that have come together under IEEE to pool their experience and resources in combating the systematic and rapid rise in computer security threats.

IEEE ICSG activities include:
 Anti-malware working group
 Malware meta-data exchange standard (MMDEF) working group
 Privilege Management Protocols working group
 Anti-malware support service which includes
 The taggant system
 Clean meta-data exchange system (CMX)

External links
 IEEE ICSG
 Anti-malware working group
 ICSG AMSS
 Malware meta-data exchange format

Computer security organizations